Milorad Krivokapić (born 30 July 1980) is a Serbian-Hungarian handball player for Hungarian club Ceglédi KKSE.

Career
Krivokapić started out at Jugović and helped the club win the EHF Challenge Cup in the 2000–01 season. He later moved abroad to Hungary and signed with Dunaferr in 2002. Three years later, Krivokapić switched to fellow Hungarian club Pick Szeged. He helped them win the national championship in the 2006–07 season. In 2010, Krivokapić moved to Slovenia and joined Koper. He would also spend three years in Israel, from 2014 to 2017, playing for Maccabi Rishon LeZion, Hapoel Rishon LeZion and Hapoel Ashdod.

At international level, Krivokapić represented Serbia and Montenegro in three major tournaments. He later switched allegiance to Hungary, making his major debut at the 2010 European Men's Handball Championship.

Personal life
Krivokapić is the younger brother of fellow handball player Marko Krivokapić.

Honours
Jugović
 EHF Challenge Cup: 2000–01
Pick Szeged
 Nemzeti Bajnokság I: 2006–07
 Magyar Kupa: 2005–06, 2007–08
Koper
 Slovenian First League: 2010–11
 Slovenian Cup: 2010–11
 EHF Challenge Cup: 2010–11

References

External links
 EHF record
 MKSZ record

1980 births
Living people
People from Senta
Serbian people of Hungarian descent
Serbian people of Montenegrin descent
Serbian male handball players
Hungarian male handball players
RK Jugović players
SC Pick Szeged players
Expatriate handball players
Serbia and Montenegro expatriate sportspeople in Hungary
Serbian expatriate sportspeople in Hungary
Serbian expatriate sportspeople in Slovenia
Serbian expatriate sportspeople in Qatar
Serbian expatriate sportspeople in Israel
Serbian expatriate sportspeople in Romania